The Winds of Change and Other Stories is a collection of short stories by American writer Isaac Asimov, published in 1983 by Doubleday.

Contents

 "About Nothing" (1975)
 "A Perfect Fit" (1981)
 "Belief" (1953), novelette
 "Death of a Foy" (1980)
 "Fair Exchange?" (1978)
 "For the Birds" (1980)
 "Found!" (1978)
 "Good Taste" (1976), novelette
 "How It Happened" (1979)
 "Ideas Die Hard" (1957), novelette
 "Ignition Point!" (1981)
 "It Is Coming" (1979), Multivac series
 "The Last Answer" (1980)
 "The Last Shuttle" (1981)
 "Lest We Remember" (1982), novelette
 "Nothing for Nothing" (1979)
 "One Night of Song" (1982), Azazel series
 "The Smile That Loses" (1982), Azazel series
 "Sure Thing" (1977)
 "To Tell at a Glance" (1983; previously published in an edited version in 1977), novelette
 "The Winds of Change" (1982)

Reception
Dave Langford reviewed The Winds of Change for White Dwarf #58, and stated that "Thankfully there are a few good pieces; but it's tragic that the title story, whose subject Asimov considers vitally important (he's right), should be ruined by incredibly ham-handed telling."

Reviews
Review by Dan Chow (1983) in Locus, #266 March 1983
Review by Alma Jo Williams (1984) in Science Fiction Review, Fall 1984
Review by Judith Hanna (1985) in Paperback Inferno, #52
Review [French] by Frédéric Kurzawa? (1985) in Fiction, #361
Review [French] by Éric Vial? (2005) in Galaxies, #36

References

Sources
Isaac Asimov, The Winds of Change, Granada 1983/ Panther, 1984/Doubleday 1984,

External links
The Winds of Change at the Internet Speculative Fiction Database

Science fiction short story collections by Isaac Asimov
1983 short story collections
Doubleday (publisher) books